Aphelonyx is a genus of oak gall wasps in the family Cynipidae, comprising three known species:

Aphelonyx cerricola (Giraud, 1859)
Aphelonyx kordestanica Melika, 2010
Aphelonyx persica Melika, Stone, Sadeghi & Pujade-Villar, 2004

References

Cynipidae
Hymenoptera genera